Stephen C. Padilla (born 1967) is an American politician, public policy, advocacy and communications consultant serving in the California State Senate since 2022. From 1994 to 2002, he served two terms on the  city council of Chula Vista, California. He served as Mayor of Chula Vista (Pop. 240,000) from 2002 to 2006 and as a member of the California Coastal Commission from 2005 to 2007, and again since 2017. He served as a member of the Board of Port Commissioners of the Unified Port of San Diego, as Board Secretary and Vice Chairman-Elect from 2009 to 2011. In 2016, he was again elected to the Chula Vista City Council.

He is also noted for being one of the state's increasing number of openly gay political leaders.

Early life
The eldest of four children, Steve Padilla was born at the U.S. Naval Hospital, San Diego.

Padilla's father was Mexican and his mother was Portuguese.

Shortly after Padilla was born, his father joined the United States Marine Corps, and was deployed to serve in the Vietnam War. Shortly after Padilla's father returned home from this tour of duty, he was killed in an automobile accident. Padilla's mother thereafter purchased a home in Chula Vista to raise her family in. Padilla's mother would remarry, giving Padilla and his siblings a stepfather.

Raised in Chula Vista since age 5, Padilla showed an interest in community at an early age, becoming active in organizations throughout his early life, which would later lead him to seek public office. He as a Cub Scout and Boy Scout, and later became involved with the Chula Vista Explorer Scouts.

Padilla's first career venture was into law enforcement.  After graduating from Bonita Vista High School, he became the youngest cadet accepted into the Southwestern Police Academy. A police officer for thirteen years, he served as a Detective, specializing in domestic violence and child abuse before entering the public arena. He served for a period as the president of the Chula Vita Police Officers Association.

While a police officer, Padilla returned to school, and received his bachelor's degree in public administration. Between 1989 and 1990 he was appointed by the City Council to various city boards and commissions, including the Board of Ethics, and Safety Commission.

Padilla worked as a substitute teacher for the Sweetwater Union High School District.

City council
Padilla was elected to the Chula Vista City Council in 1994. He was the first person of Latino descent elected to that office in the city's history, despite the city's diverse population. Padilla won re-election in 1998.

During his early tenure, he was noted and criticized for his harsh criticism of the existing City Manager. Padilla was instrumental in bringing about the hiring of a new City Manager and the implementation of city-wide ethics training.

Padilla contributed to several changes in city law, including the prohibition of machine sales of tobacco in the city, and improvements to the health and safety code oversight in mobile home parks. He was also leading figure in city finance reforms, including a move to planning the city's budget on two-year cycles.

Padilla called for San Diego Unified Port District Board member David Malcolm to resign over his consulting contract with Duke Energy.

During part of his tenure, Padilla held the post of Deputy Mayor.

Mayoralty

Election
Padilla was elected the 38th Mayor of Chula Vista on November 5, 2002, defeating fellow City Council member Mary Salas, a colleague and political ally. The race between the two democrats was hotly contested and closely observed given the nature of the candidate's past relationship and the historic nature of the election.

Chula Vista is the second-largest city in San Diego County, after San Diego proper.

The election was an open-race, as incumbent Shirley Horton was term-limited.

Padilla could not have sought another term on the city council in 2002, due to a prohibition on serving more than two terms consecutively.

With both Padilla and Salas running, the election marked the first-time that two incumbent Chula Vista City Council members had run for mayor. The election was also historic in that all three candidates running (Salas, Padilla, and Petra Barajas) were Hispanic, guaranteeing that the city would elect its first Hispanic mayor.

One of Padilla's pledged priorities was to promote plans to manage growth in the city's eastern segment and to regenerate its older neighborhoods.

To address the increased traffic congestion stemming from the city rapid growth, Padilla proposed ensuring that developers pay for roads and public services prior to receiving approval for their developments.

Padilla proposed creating a unified school district within city limits.

Padilla was endorsed by two of other four other members of the city council, as well as the Chula Vista Chamber of Commerce and the Chula Vista Police Officers Association. In addition to two incumbent city council members, he also received the endorsement of a council member-elect who had won election in the first-round of the city's elections.

With much political overlap between Salas and Padilla, the race was seen as being debated on which candidate had the superior experience to lead the city.

Throughout the campaign, Salas and Padilla criticized each other for accepting campaign contributions from different real estate developers.

A tense race from its inception, in the closing days of the general election, things became particularly hostile as both candidates assailed each other's records. Additionally, Padilla's campaign circulated literature quoting Salas as having used the word "gringos" in a quote to the newspaper El Latino.

Voter turnout was significantly lower in the 2002 election than it had been in the previous two elections.

Tenure
During his tenure as mayor, he is credited with reinvigorating efforts to bring a four-year university to Chula Vista and building a diverse coalition of interests around a large waterfront development project for the city.

Padilla sought to focus on revitalization for the city's aging downtown area and the addition of parks and open spaces. His focus on downtown redevelopment earned him both allies and strong critics, who feared redevelopment of the city's downtown area would bring larger buildings and population. He gained significant attention in the region while leading the city in an evaluation of options for energy independence, resulting in a very public battle and debate with the area's public utility, San Diego Gas & Electric.

In collaboration the San Diego Unified Port District, Padilla played a key role in initiating the Bay-front Master Plan, an effort to develop  waterfront to hot public parks, hotels, restaurants, shops and new housing.

While mayor, he launched a Give a Book drive, which saw the donation of more than 100,000 books to underprivileged children in San Diego County.

Under Padilla's leadership, Chula Vista was selected as the American site for the University Park and Research Center (UPRC), beating out other cities across the nation. On March 28, 2006, the Chula Vista City Council gave approval to the National Energy Center for Sustainable Communities, which would be the first component of the UPRC.

While mayor, he held numerous local, regional, state-wide and national posts during his term as mayor and since including; the board of the San Diego Association of Governments (SANDAG), the League of California Cities and the United States Conference of Mayors.. He also chaired the SANDAG Public Safety Committee.

In July 2005, Padilla was appointed by then California Assembly Speaker Fabian Núñez to the California Coastal Commission. The Coastal Commission is California's powerful coastal protection authority which regulates land use along all  of California's coastline. The Unified Port of San Diego governs the tidelands trust lands of San Diego Bay which span the five bay front cities of San Diego, Coronado, National City, Chula Vista and Imperial Beach.

In August, 2005 while speaking at the annual Stonewall Rally of San Diego Pride, a rally on civil rights for gays and lesbians, Padilla acknowledged publicly what many had known privately for a few years – that he is gay. His "coming out" at the time gained him both national attention and political opponents. At that time, Chula Vista became the largest city in the United States with an openly gay mayor. He was the first openly-gay elected city official in Chula Vista's history.

Padilla was featured on the cover of San Diego Metropolitan magazine (July, 2003); named one of the "25 Leading Men in North America" by Instinct magazine (Nov, 2005); and one of "50 People to Watch" by San Diego Magazine (Jan, 2006).

Reelection campaign
In 2006, Steve Padilla lost his re-election bid to Republican Chula Vista Elementary School Board member Cheryl Cox, the wife of popular former Chula Vista mayor and current county supervisor Greg Cox, 45.76% to Cox's 54.24%.

Cox's campaign against Padilla focused on the drop in City reserves from $40 million to $10 million while Padilla served as Mayor and largely on the fact the city had hired security for Padilla in the wake of anonymous threats.

Padilla stated that his top priorities for a second term would have been continuing to reduce traffic/congestion through smart growth, continuing to improve parks and education, and continuing to make investments in public safety.

Padilla was endorsed by the Chula Vista Chamber of Commerce, Chula Vista Firefighter's Association, Chula Vista Police Officer's Association, and the League of Conservation Voters.

Several scandals, as well as some negative reaction to his coming out, are believed to have contributed to Padilla's defeat. During the campaign, Cox's supporter seized on him for having hired a bodyguard with city funds.

Post-mayoral career
Padilla's tenure on the California Coastal Commission, which he had been appointed to in 2005, ended in 2007.

Padilla remained active in local, state and national public affairs after leaving office as mayor.

Padilla is President of Aquarius Group, Inc. a consulting business he began in 2007, and has been a published public affairs columnist for various local publications in San Diego.

Padilla served on the Governing Board of Walden Family Services, a private non-profit foster family agency serving special needs children in six California counties from 2007 to 2009.  He completed service on the Independent Task Force on U.S. Immigration Policy for the Council on Foreign Relations in early 2009, when the Task Force findings and recommendations were released.

Despite rumors of his withdrawal from politics, Padilla surprised many when in late 2009 he successfully applied for appointment to the Board of Port Commissioners. Padilla was appointed to fill the remainder of the term of Commissioner Mike Najera, who had been removed by the City Council a few months earlier. During his tenure, he won praise from both allies and critics alike for helping to move Chula Vista's bay front planning efforts forward after a period of stagnation.

In early 2011, Chula Vista's city council failed to appoint Padilla to a full 4-year term in his own right in a 3–2 vote, just hours after he was sworn in as vice chairman at the commission's annual luncheon.

In 2014 Padilla sought to re-enter elective office and sought a seat on the Chula Vista City Council. In what became the closest election in city history, his campaign received broad organizational and political support, but lost the bid by only 2 votes out of nearly 39,000 cast. He was defeated by John McCann. McCann was a former Chula Vista City Council member, having previously served from 2002 through 2010. McCann, a Republican, had, in fact, originally succeeded Padilla as the officeholder for seat 2 on the City Council in 2002, and had, as councilman-elect in 2002, endorsed Padilla in the second-round of his first mayoral race.

Return to City Council and Coastal Commission
After his extraordinarily narrow defeat in the 2014 city council election, Padilla opted to seek a different seat on the Chula Vista City Council in 2016, and was elected. This election was the first time that an openly-gay man had won an election to city office in Chula Vista.

May 31, 2017, Padilla was again appointed to the California Coastal Commission, this time by California Assembly Speaker Anthony Rendon. During part of this tenure, he served as vice-chair, and now serves as chair of the commission.

Padilla was reelected to the Chula Vista City Council in 2020.

Due to the city's prohibition on serving more than two terms consecutively, Padilla will be prevented from running for reelection to City Council in 2024.

Personal life
Padilla is openly gay, having come out publicly in 2005.

While now openly-gay, Padilla was previously married to a woman.

Padilla came out privately to his family in 1999, and separated from his wife around this time. He divorced his wife and was awarded sole custody of their daughter, Ashleigh. While rumors existed about his sexuality, and some regarded it to be an open secret by the time he ran for mayor, he did not come out publicly until 2005.

On 15 March 2020 Padilla tested positive for COVID-19. Only one week later, Mr. Padilla was admitted to the Intensive Care Unit at his local hospital.

Electoral history

City council

Mayor

 Barajas received 7 votes as a write-in in the runoff

References 

 .
 .
 .

  .

1967 births
LGBT mayors of places in the United States
Living people
Gay politicians
California Democrats
Mayors of Chula Vista, California
LGBT people from California
Politicians from San Diego
American politicians of Mexican descent
American people of Portuguese descent
21st-century American politicians